Everything Happens at Night is a 1939 American drama-comedy film starring Sonja Henie, Ray Milland and Robert Cummings.

Plot
American Geoffrey Thompson and Englishman Ken Morgan are reporters from rival newspapers who are sent to a remote Swiss village to find Nobel Prize winner, Dr. Hugo Norden. Nodern escaped from a concentration camp and was reportedly killed but there are rumors he is living in the village.

Both men arrive in the village and are forced to share a room together. They meet Louise, a young woman whom both men fall in love with. It turns out that Louise is Norden's daughter.

Geoffrey intercepts Ken's cable to his paper and directs it to his own paper. The story upsets Louise, who was unaware they were reporters, and brings the Gestapo on a mission to kill Norden. Geoffrey and Ken team up to smuggle Louise and her father across the border to the safety of France.

They are all about to sail to America. Ken arranges for Geoffrey to miss the boat, ensuring that he will have Louise to himself.

Cast 

 Sonja Henie as Louise Norden
 Ray Milland as Geoffrey Thompson
 Robert Cummings as Ken Morgan
 Maurice Moscovitch as Dr Hugo Norden 
 Leonid Kinskey as Groder
 Alan Dinehart as Fred Sherwood
 Fritz Feld as Gendarme
 Jody Gilbert as Hilda
 Victor Varconi as Cavas
 William Edmunds as Hotel Clerk
 George Davis as Bellhop
 Paul Porcasi as Pierre – Bartender
 Michael Visaroff as Otto – Woodcutter
 Eleanor Wesselhoeft as Woodcutter's Wife
 Christian Rub as Telegrapher
 Ferdinand Munier as Conductor
 Holmes Herbert as Featherstone
 Rolfe Sedan as Waiter 
 Frank Reicher as Pharmacist
 John Bleifer as Second Sled Driver

Production
In April 1939 Fox announced the film as part of its slate for the following year. It was based on an original screenplay and was a different type of Sonja Henie vehicle as the storyline was more serious. Richard Greene was originally announced for the role of the English reporter. Greene was delayed working on Little Old New York so Fox borrowed Robert Cummings from Universal.

Filming started in September. Gregory Ratoff had to direct some skating sequences because director Irving Cummins was pulled on to Johnny Apollo. Filming finished by October.

Reception
Filmink  said it "feels like the one SH [Henie] film not originally devised for SH. Gloomy, almost film noir treatment. Interesting. Different SH movie. Strong male leads."

References

External links 

 
 
Everything Happens at Night at Letterbox DVD

1939 films
20th Century Fox films
Films directed by Irving Cummings
Films set in Switzerland
American black-and-white films
American comedy-drama films
1939 comedy-drama films
1930s American films